Carsten Hallum (born 9 September 1969 in Denmark) is a Danish retired footballer who now works as a mechanical worker and chief designer at an animal testing company in his home country.

Career

Callum started his senior career with Hvidovre IF. In 1997, he signed for Raith Rovers in the Scottish Premier League, where he made six appearances and scored zero goals.  After that, he played for Danish clubs Aarhus Gymnastikforening, Nordsjælland, and Hvidovre IF before retiring in 2004.

References

External links 
 Danes delight and a doddle for Twaddle; Kilmarnock 0, Raith 1 
 Raith rely on Danish imports to set up their great escape McLeish'ss quest is to find space to breathe 
 Sporløs med Carsten Hallum 
 Carsten Hallum brød isen 
 Carsten Hallum med igen

Living people
1969 births
Danish men's footballers
Danish expatriate men's footballers
Danish Superliga players
Danish 1st Division players
Scottish Premier League players
Hvidovre IF players
Aarhus Gymnastikforening players
Association football forwards
Raith Rovers F.C. players
F.C. Copenhagen players
FC Nordsjælland players
Expatriate footballers in Scotland